The citrine warbler (Myiothlypis luteoviridis) is a species of bird in the family Parulidae.  The term citrine refers to its yellowish colouration.  It is found in Bolivia, Colombia, Ecuador, Peru, and Venezuela.  Its natural habitat is subtropical or tropical moist montane forests.

Behaviour
Pairs of citrine warblers are known to forage in the lower levels and edges of forests. They often do this among mixed-species flocks.

References

citrine warbler
Birds of the Northern Andes
citrine warbler
citrine warbler
Taxonomy articles created by Polbot